These 195 species belong to the genus Microplitis, braconid wasps.

Microplitis species

 Microplitis abrs Austin & Dangerfield, 1993
 Microplitis adelaidensis Austin & Dangerfield, 1993
 Microplitis adisurae (Subba Rao & Sharma, 1960)
 Microplitis adrianguadamuzi Fernandez-Triana & Whitfield, 2015
 Microplitis aduncus (Ruthe, 1860)
 Microplitis ajmerensis Rao & Kurian, 1950
 Microplitis alajensis Telenga, 1955
 Microplitis alaskensis Ashmead, 1902
 Microplitis albipennis Abdinbekova, 1969
 Microplitis albotibialis Telenga, 1955
 Microplitis alexanderrojasi Fernandez-Triana & Whitfield, 2015
 Microplitis altissimus Fernandez-Triana, 2018
 Microplitis amplitergius Xu & He, 2002
 Microplitis aprilae Austin & Dangerfield, 1993
 Microplitis areyongensis Austin & Dangerfield, 1993
 Microplitis ariatus Papp, 1979
 Microplitis atamiensis Ashmead, 1906
 Microplitis autographae Muesebeck, 1922
 Microplitis bamagensis Austin & Dangerfield, 1993
 Microplitis basalis (Bingham, 1906)
 Microplitis basipallescentis Song & Chen, 2008
 Microplitis beyarslani Inanç, 2002
 Microplitis bicoloratus Xu & He, 2003
 Microplitis blascoi Papp & Shaw, 2001
 Microplitis bomiensis  Zhang, 2019
 Microplitis borealis Xu & He, 2000
 Microplitis bradleyi Muesebeck, 1922
 Microplitis brassicae Muesebeck, 1922
 Microplitis brevispina Song & Chen, 2008
 Microplitis capeki Nixon, 1970
 Microplitis carinatus Song & Chen, 2008
 Microplitis carinicollis (Cameron, 1905)
 Microplitis carteri Walley, 1932
 Microplitis cebes Nixon, 1970
 Microplitis ceratomiae Riley, 1881
 Microplitis chacoensis (Cameron, 1908)
 Microplitis changbaishanus Song & Chen, 2008
 Microplitis chivensis Telenga, 1955
 Microplitis choui Xu & He, 2000
 Microplitis chrysostigma Tobias, 1964
 Microplitis chui Xu & He, 2002
 Microplitis coactus (Lundbeck, 1896)
 Microplitis combinatus (Papp, 1984)
 Microplitis confusus Muesebeck, 1922
 Microplitis crassiantenna Song & Chen, 2008
 Microplitis crassifemoralis Alexeev, 1971
 Microplitis crenulatus (Provancher, 1888)
 Microplitis croceipes (Cresson, 1872)
 Microplitis cubitellanus Xu & He, 2000
 Microplitis daitojimensis Sonan, 1940
 Microplitis decens Tobias, 1964
 Microplitis decipiens Prell, 1925
 Microplitis demolitor Wilkinson, 1934
 Microplitis deprimator (Fabricius, 1798)
 Microplitis desertorum Telenga, 1955
 Microplitis desertus Alexeev, 1977
 Microplitis docilis Nixon, 1970
 Microplitis dornator (Papp, 1987)
 Microplitis eminius (Papp, 1987)
 Microplitis eremitus Reinhard, 1880
 Microplitis erythrogaster Abdinbekova, 1969
 Microplitis espinachi Walker, 2003
 Microplitis excisus Telenga, 1955
 Microplitis feltiae Muesebeck, 1922
 Microplitis figueresi Walker, 2003
 Microplitis flavipalpis (Brullé, 1832)
 Microplitis fordi Nixon, 1970
 Microplitis francopupulini Fernandez-Triana & Whitfield, 2015
 Microplitis fraudulentus (Papp, 1984)
 Microplitis fujianicus Song & Zhang, 2017
 Microplitis fulvicornis (Wesmael, 1837)
 Microplitis galinarius Kotenko, 2007
 Microplitis gerulus Papp, 1980
 Microplitis gidjus Austin & Dangerfield, 1993
 Microplitis glabrior Alexeev, 1971
 Microplitis gortynae Riley, 1881
 Microplitis goughi Austin & Dangerfield, 1993
 Microplitis hebertbakeri Fernandez-Triana & Whitfield, 2015
 Microplitis helicoverpae Xu & He, 2000
 Microplitis heterocerus (Ruthe, 1860)
 Microplitis hirtifacialis Song & You, 2008
 Microplitis hispalensis Marshall, 1898
 Microplitis hova Granger, 1949
 Microplitis hyalinipennis Alexeev, 1971
 Microplitis hyphantriae Ashmead, 1898
 Microplitis idia Nixon, 1970
 Microplitis impressus (Wesmael, 1837)
 Microplitis improvisus (Papp, 1984)
 Microplitis incurvatus Xu & He, 2002
 Microplitis indicus Marsh, 1978
 Microplitis infula (Kotenko, 1994)
 Microplitis jamesi Austin & Dangerfield, 1993
 Microplitis jiangsuensis Xu & He, 2000
 Microplitis jorgehernandezi Fernandez-Triana & Whitfield, 2015
 Microplitis jorgeluisi Fernandez-Triana, 2018
 Microplitis juanmanueli Fernandez-Triana, 2018
 Microplitis julioalbertoi Fernandez-Triana, 2018
 Microplitis karakurti Rossikov, 1904
 Microplitis kaszabi Papp, 1980
 Microplitis kewleyi Muesebeck, 1922
 Microplitis kurandensis Austin & Dangerfield, 1993
 Microplitis lacteus Austin & Dangerfield, 1993
 Microplitis laticinctus Muesebeck, 1922
 Microplitis latistigmus Muesebeck, 1922
 Microplitis leoniae Niezabitowski, 1910
 Microplitis leucaniae Xu & He, 2002
 Microplitis lineatus Austin & Dangerfield, 1993
 Microplitis longicaudus Muesebeck, 1922
 Microplitis longiradiusis Xu & He, 2003
 Microplitis longwangshanus Xu & He, 2000
 Microplitis lugubris (Ruthe, 1860)
 Microplitis lugubroides van Achterberg, 2006
 Microplitis mahunkai (Papp, 1979)
 Microplitis malimba (Papp, 1984)
 Microplitis mamestrae Weed, 1887
 Microplitis mandibularis (Thomson, 1895)
 Microplitis manilae Ashmead, 1904
 Microplitis mariamargaritae Fernandez-Triana, 2018
 Microplitis marini Whitfield, 2003
 Microplitis marshallii Kokujev, 1898
 Microplitis masneri Austin & Dangerfield, 1993
 Microplitis maturus Weed, 1888
 Microplitis mediator (Haliday, 1834)
 Microplitis melianae Viereck, 1911
 Microplitis mencianus Xu & He, 1999
 Microplitis mexicanus (Cameron, 1887)
 Microplitis minutus Alexeev, 1977
 Microplitis moestus (Ratzeburg, 1852)
 Microplitis mongolicus Papp, 1967
 Microplitis montanus Muesebeck, 1922
 Microplitis murkyi Gupta, 2013
 Microplitis murrayi Austin & Dangerfield, 1993
 Microplitis naenia Nixon, 1970
 Microplitis narendrani Ranjith & Nasser, 2015
 Microplitis necopinatus (Papp, 1984)
 Microplitis newguineaensis Austin & Dangerfield, 1993
 Microplitis nielseni Austin & Dangerfield, 1993
 Microplitis nigrifemur Xu & He, 2006
 Microplitis nigritus Muesebeck, 1922
 Microplitis obscuripennatus Xu & He, 1999
 Microplitis ocellatae (Bouché, 1834)
 Microplitis ochraceus Szépligeti, 1896
 Microplitis paizhensis  Zhang, 2019
 Microplitis pallidipennis Tobias, 1964
 Microplitis pallidipes Szépligeti, 1902
 Microplitis pellucidus Telenga, 1955
 Microplitis pennatulae Ranjith & Nasser, 2015
 Microplitis perelegans (Bingham, 1906)
 Microplitis pipus Austin & Dangerfield, 1993
 Microplitis plutellae Muesebeck, 1922
 Microplitis prodeniae Rao & Kurian, 1950
 Microplitis pseudomurinus Abdinbekova, 1969
 Microplitis pseudoochraceus Alexeev, 1977
 Microplitis quadridentatus (Provancher, 1886)
 Microplitis quintilis Viereck, 1917
 Microplitis ratzeburgii (Ruthe, 1858)
 Microplitis retentus (Papp, 1984)
 Microplitis rufipes Dutu-Lacatusu, 1961
 Microplitis rufiventris Kokujev, 1914
 Microplitis schmidti Austin & Dangerfield, 1993
 Microplitis scrophulariae Szépligeti, 1898
 Microplitis scutellatus Muesebeck, 1922
 Microplitis semicircularis (Ratzeburg, 1844)
 Microplitis similis Lyle, 1921
 Microplitis sofron Nixon, 1970
 Microplitis sordipes (Ziegler, 1834)
 Microplitis spectabilis (Haliday, 1834)
 Microplitis spinolae (Nees, 1834)
 Microplitis spodopterae Rao & Kurian, 1950
 Microplitis steinbergi Tobias, 1964
 Microplitis stigmaticus (Ratzeburg, 1844)
 Microplitis storeyi Austin & Dangerfield, 1993
 Microplitis strenuus Reinhard, 1880
 Microplitis suavis Alexeev, 1971
 Microplitis subsulcatus Granger, 1949
 Microplitis tadzhicus Telenga, 1949
 Microplitis taptor (Papp, 1987)
 Microplitis tasmaniensis Austin & Dangerfield, 1993
 Microplitis taylori Austin & Dangerfield, 1993
 Microplitis teba (Kotenko, 1994)
 Microplitis testaceicornis Niezabitowski, 1910
 Microplitis tobiasi Kotenko, 2007
 Microplitis tristis (Nees, 1834)
 Microplitis tuberculatus (Bouché, 1834)
 Microplitis tuberculifer (Wesmael, 1837)
 Microplitis tunetensis Marshall, 1901
 Microplitis varicolor Viereck, 1917
 Microplitis varipes (Ruthe, 1860)
 Microplitis viduus (Ruthe, 1860)
 Microplitis vitobiasi Fernandez-Triana, 2019
 Microplitis xanthopus (Ruthe, 1860)
 Microplitis zhaoi Xu & He, 2000
 † Microplitis elegans Timon-David, 1944
 † Microplitis primordialis (Brues, 1906)
 † Microplitis vesperus Brues, 1910

References

Microplitis